Leendert Arent-Willem de Lange (born 13 November 1972) is a Dutch politician. He has been mayor of Wassenaar since 18 July 2019. Previously he was a member of the House of Representatives for the People's Party for Freedom and Democracy, serving from 31 March 2015 to 23 March 2017 and once again from 31 October 2017 to 3 July 2019. De Lange was alderman in Noordwijk between 2006 and 2013 and in Wassenaar between 2013 and 2014 where he also served as deputy mayor.

Career
De Lange was born on 13 November 1972 in Wassenaar. Subsequently, he studied public administration theory at Leiden University from 1995 to 2000. He worked at the district court and later for the public prosecutor of The Hague court between 1996 and 2000. From 2000 to 2005 he worked as advisor on parliamentary and ministerial contacts at the municipality of The Hague.

De Lange became member of the People's Party for Freedom and Democracy in 1992. He was member of the municipal council of Leiden between 1999 and 2006. Between May 2006 and February 2013 he was alderman in Noordwijk. From 11 February 2013 until 1 June 2014 he was alderman and deputy mayor in his birth town of Wassenaar. After his terms as alderman he worked for communication firm Dietz.

In the parliamentary elections of 2012 De Lange occupied place 53 on the candidate list of the People's Party for Freedom and Democracy. On 31 March 2015 he entered the House of Representatives of the Netherlands when he replaced René Leegte who had resigned. In the House of Representatives his portfolio was health care. His term in office ended on 23 March 2017. De Lange returned to the House on 31 October 2017. He resigned from the House on 3 July 2019 to become mayor of Wassenaar. On 18 July 2019 he was installed in this position.

References

External links
  Profile on Parlement.com

1972 births
Living people
Aldermen in South Holland
Aldermen of Wassenaar
Leiden University alumni
Mayors in South Holland
Members of the House of Representatives (Netherlands)
Municipal councillors of Leiden
People from Wassenaar
People's Party for Freedom and Democracy politicians
21st-century Dutch politicians